The 2018 Torneo Internazionale Femminile Antico Tiro a Volo was a professional tennis tournament played on outdoor clay courts. It was the tenth edition of the tournament and was part of the 2018 ITF Women's Circuit. It took place in Rome, Italy, on 2–8 July 2018.

Singles main draw entrants

Seeds 

 1 Rankings as of 25 June 2018.

Other entrants 
The following players received a wildcard into the singles main draw:
  Karolayne Alexandre da Rosa
  Cristiana Ferrando
  Camilla Rosatello
  Stefania Rubini

The following player received entry using a protected ranking:
  Réka Luca Jani

The following players received entry from the qualifying draw:
  Lisa Sabino
  Liudmila Samsonova
  Lucrezia Stefanini
  Anastasia Zarycká

Champions

Singles

 Dayana Yastremska def.  Anastasia Potapova, 6–1, 6–0

Doubles

 Laura Pigossi /  Renata Zarazúa def.  Anastasia Grymalska /  Giorgia Marchetti, 6–1, 4–6, [13–11]

External links 
 2018 Torneo Internazionale Femminile Antico Tiro a Volo at ITFtennis.com
 Official website

2018 ITF Women's Circuit
2018 in Italian sport
Tennis tournaments in Italy